Aleksandr Mikhailovich Trofimov (born 27 April 1937) is a former Soviet and Russian diplomat. He served in various diplomatic roles from 1960 onwards, and was Ambassador of Russia to Estonia between 1992 and 1997.

Career
Trofimov was born on 27 April 1937. He graduated from Moscow State Institute of International Relations in 1960 and began his career with the Soviet Ministry of Foreign Affairs. His work took him to various overseas postings, as well as positions within the ministry's central apparatus. In 1972 he graduated from the Higher Diplomatic School of the Soviet Ministry of Foreign Affairs. In 1987 he was appointed Ambassador of the Soviet Union to Mali, a post he held during and after the dissolution of the Soviet Union in late 1991, after which he represented the Russian Federation to Mali, until 1992.

Trofimov was then appointed Ambassador of Russia to Estonia in 1992, serving until his recall in 1997. On his return to Russia he became deputy director of the Second European Department of the Russian Ministry of Foreign Affairs in 1998, before being appointed Ambassador of Russia to Ivory Coast in April 2000, with dual accreditation to Burkina Faso. He was recalled on 8 June 2006.

Trofimov has the diplomatic rank of Ambassador Extraordinary and Plenipotentiary, and is fluent in French, English and Turkish. He is married, with a son and a daughter. He was awarded the Order of the Cross of Terra Mariana, I class, by the Estonian state.

References

1937 births
Living people
Moscow State Institute of International Relations alumni
Soviet diplomats
Ambassador Extraordinary and Plenipotentiary (Soviet Union)
Ambassadors of the Soviet Union to Mali
Russian diplomats
Ambassadors of Russia to Mali
Ambassadors of Russia to Ivory Coast
Ambassadors of Russia to Estonia
Ambassadors of Russia to Burkina Faso
Recipients of the Order of the Cross of Terra Mariana, 1st Class